Anti-p62 antibodies (AP62A) are found in a primary biliary cirrhosis. The p62 protein is also more frequent in Stage IV primary biliary cirrhosis and is prognostic for severe disease.  The autoantigen is the nucleoporin 62kDA protein.

References

p
P